Kristen Claire McNabb (born April 17, 1994) is an American soccer player who plays as a defender for San Diego Wave of the National Women's Soccer League (NWSL). McNabb has represented the United States on the under-18 and under-23 national teams. She played collegiate soccer at the University of Virginia.

Early life and education
McNabb was raised in Montville, New Jersey, where she attended Montville Township High School. She played club soccer for PDA Charge and captained the team to the national championship games twice. She was ranked 34 nationally by TopDrawerSoccer.

Virginia Cavaliers, 2012–2016
McNabb attended the University of Virginia where she played for the Cavaliers from 2013 to 2016 after redshirting the 2012 season due to injury. During the 2013 season, she made 19 appearances for the Cavaliers including two starts. She endured a knee injury in a match against Virginia Tech on October 31 which prevented her from playing the remainder of the season. The following season, she started in all 26 games and scored her first goal during a match against Tennessee. During the 2015 season, McNabb started in all 23 games and was named to the Second-Team NSCAA All-Southeast Region. In the 2016 season, McNabb captained the Cavaliers. That September she was named the Atlantic Coast Conference (ACC) Co-Offensive Player Of The Week while playing as a defender and scoring twice against Virginia Tech. The same year, McNabb helped the Cavaliers to a  record. The team reached the Round of 16 of the NCAA Division 1 Soccer Championship for the 12th straight season.

Club career

OL Reign, 2017–2021
In January 2017, McNabb was selected by Reign FC as the 37th overall selection in the 2017 NWSL College Draft. She made her debut starting for the club during the season opener on April 15 against Sky Blue FC. She scored her first professional goal on April 22 against the Houston Dash.

Melbourne Victory, 2017 (loan)
In October 2017, McNabb joined Australian club Melbourne Victory on loan for the off-season.

San Diego Wave FC, 2022–
In December 2021, San Diego Wave selected McNabb in the 2022 NWSL Expansion Draft.

International career
McNabb has represented the United States on the under-18 and under-23 national teams.

Personal life
Professional hockey player Colin Blackwell is McNabb's cousin.

References

External links 

 
 U.S. Soccer player profile
 Virginia Cavaliers player profile 
 

1994 births
Living people
Soccer players from New Jersey
Montville Township High School alumni
People from Montville, New Jersey
Virginia Cavaliers women's soccer players
OL Reign draft picks
OL Reign players
Sportspeople from Morris County, New Jersey
Melbourne Victory FC (A-League Women) players
National Women's Soccer League players
A-League Women players
American women's soccer players
Women's association football defenders
American expatriate women's soccer players
Expatriate women's soccer players in Australia
American expatriate sportspeople in Australia
San Diego Wave FC players